The Leona River is a river in Texas. It runs through the counties of Uvalde, Zavala and Frio. Archeological discoveries related to indigenous peoples have been made in areas where the river has drained.

See also
List of rivers of Texas

References

USGS Geographic Names Information Service
USGS Hydrologic Unit Map - State of Texas (1974)

Rivers of Texas
Rivers of Uvalde County, Texas
Rivers of Zavala County, Texas
Bodies of water of Frio County, Texas